Touray is a common Gambian surname of Mandinka origin. As well as the family name Ceesay, it originally indicated the descent of its bearer from a Marabout, a  West African Islamic dignitary.
Notable people with the name Touray include:

Alieu Touray-Saidy (born 1976), American former soccer player
Ibou Touray (born 1994), Gambian footballer
Isatou Touray (born 1955), Gambian feminist activist
Josephine Touray (born 1979), Danish handball player
Njogu Touray (born 1960), Gambian artist
Omar Touray (born 1965), Gambian diplomat
Pa Dembo Touray (born 1980), retired Gambian footballer 
Sainey Touray (born 1990), Gambian footballer
Shekou Touray (born 1945), Sierra Leonean diplomat

References

Mandinka surnames